Nocardioides marinisabuli is a Gram-positive and non-motile bacterium from the genus Nocardioides which has been isolated from beach sand in Jeju, Korea.

References

External links
Type strain of Nocardioides marinisabuli at BacDive -  the Bacterial Diversity Metadatabase	

marinisabuli
Bacteria described in 2007